The Dwarves of Rockhome is an accessory for the Dungeons & Dragons fantasy role-playing game.

Contents
The Dwarves of Rockhome is a supplement which details the dwarven land of Rockhome, and includes rules for dwarf characters.

Publication history
The Dwarves of Rockhome was written by Aaron Allston, with a cover by Clyde Caldwell and interior illustrations by Stephen Fabian, and was published by TSR in 1988 as a 96-page booklet with a large color map and an outer folder.

Reception

Reviews

References

Dungeons & Dragons Gazetteers
Mystara
Role-playing game supplements introduced in 1988